This is a list of Nigerian films released before 1970.

Colonial era

1920s

1930s

1940s

1950s

Republical era

1960s

See also 

 List of Nigerian films

References

External links 

Lists of Nigerian films by year
1960s in Nigerian cinema
1950s in Nigerian cinema
1940s in Nigerian cinema
1930s in Nigerian cinema
1920s in Nigerian cinema